Mira Ghniem (born May 18, 1983) is a Jordanian Olympic swimmer. She represented Jordan in the 1996 Summer Olympics in Atlanta.

Olympic participation

Atlanta 1996

Ghniem was the youngest participant for Jordan in the tournament, aged only 13 years and 68 days then. Till 2017, Ghniem was still the youngest ever participant for Jordan in the Olympics.

She did not qualify round one, and ranked 43rd in the final standing.

References

1983 births
Living people
Jordanian female swimmers
Olympic swimmers of Jordan
Swimmers at the 1996 Summer Olympics
20th-century Jordanian women